A former village, Amby is now a neighborhood (part 25) of Maastricht, in the Netherlands, located about 4 km northeast of the center of the city.

From January 2, 1839, to July 1, 1970, Amby existed as a separate municipality.

In November 2008, an amateur archaeologist discovered in a field 2 meters out of Amby the largest ever found Celtic gold and silver treasure in the Netherlands. Archaeologists from Maastricht and the VU University Amsterdam recovered 70 silver and 39 golden coins which dates back to the 1st century before Christ.

Images

Former municipalities of Limburg (Netherlands)
Populated places in Limburg (Netherlands)
Neighbourhoods of Maastricht